Varduhi Vardanyan (June 26, 1976 – October 15, 2006) was an Armenian singer. She has participated in many international song contests and always won many awards and was awarded best singer of Armenia.

Early life 
Varduhi Vardanyan was born on June 26, 1976, in Yerevan, Armenia. She is one of three children in the family.

Since her early childhood, she had a passion towards singing. She used everything similar to microphone to sing. Eventually it became unique way of self-education for her. She had a 96-page copybook containing her favorite pioneer songs.

In 1983, a music group was established at her school, where she started to take classes. Later on the music group was named after Ashot Bznuni.

In 1986, Vardanyan started to attend Naira Gyurjinyan's vocal group to improve her skills. Afterwards she studied at the musical school named after Alexandr Spendiaryan. During these years she developed her very own musical taste. Her dream was to sing with Whitney Houston.

Education 
1992 – graduated from the 8th high school named after Alexander Pushkin. 
1993 – graduated from musical school
1993 – entered Linguistic University named after Valery Bryusov at the section of English language and politics.
1994 – entered State Song Theatre and since 1995 she has worked there,
1994-1999 – after studying at university, she started to work as a teacher of the English language .
2003 – graduated from Yerevan State Conservatory named after Komitas.

Career 
1994 – together with the group "Jazz-Pop" participated in international contest held in Sverdlovsk and got Grand Prix.
1995 – started to work at Armenian state music theatre.
1996 – participated to the contest of young singers "Yalta - Moscow" transit, where she got a prize for the best performance.
1999 – she was awarded best singer of Armenia.
2000 – in the contest "Discovery" held in Bulgaria she got Grand Prix and an additional Audience Choice Award.
2000 – in Macedonia she again got Grand Prix.
2000 – participated in International Festival of Arts “Slavianski Bazaar" and got second prize.
2001 – participated in international festival "Море друзей 2001" in Yalta and got second prize.

Death 
She died on October 15, 2006, in a car accident at Sevan - Martuni highway. She is buried at the Tokhmakh cemetery. After her death, many Armenian programs were dedicated to her, including Benefis, Half-Opened Windows, and The Mechanics of Happiness.

Family 
 Husband: Aram Avoyan
 Child: Ruben Avoyan, born in 1998

Discography

Studio albums 
 Disarray (2003), (2006)

Posthumous 
 Only you (2007)
 13 songs dedicated to Varduhi Vardanyan (2008)
 You are mine (2011)

Links

References

1976 births
2006 deaths
21st-century Armenian women singers
Musicians from Yerevan
Road incident deaths in Armenia